Symphaeophyma is a genus of fungi in the family Parmulariaceae. A monotypic genus, it contains the single species Symphaeophyma subtropicale.

References

Parmulariaceae
Monotypic Dothideomycetes genera